Landlord and Tenant Act (with variations) is a stock short title used for legislation about rights and responsibilities of landlords and tenants of leasehold estate in Hong Kong, the United Kingdom and the United States.

List

Hong Kong
The Landlord and Tenant (Consolidation) Ordinance 1947
The Distress for Rent Ordinance 1883

United Kingdom
The Landlord and Tenant Act 1709
The Landlord and Tenant Act 1730
The Landlord and Tenant Act 1851
The Landlord and Tenant Act 1927
The Landlord and Tenant (War Damage) Act 1939
The Landlord and Tenant (Rent Control) Act 1949
The Landlord and Tenant Act 1954
The Landlord and Tenant Act 1985
The Landlord and Tenant Act 1987
The Landlord and Tenant Act 1988
The Landlord and Tenant (Covenants) Act 1995

The Landlord and Tenant Acts 1927 and 1954 means the Landlord and Tenant Act 1927 and the Landlord and Tenant Act 1954.

United States
The Uniform Residential Landlord and Tenant Act (1972)

See also
List of short titles
Section 8 notice

References

Lists of legislation by short title
Lists of Acts of the Parliament of the United Kingdom
English property law
Landlord–tenant law